Jazz: A History of the New York Scene is a book by Len Kunstadt (founder, with blues great Victoria Spivey, of the Spivey Records label) and Sam Charters documenting the 20th-century jazz scene in New York City.

The Half Note Jazz Club: Cats & Friends a book by Mike Canterino
Jazz books